Rohr is a small village in the municipality of Rohrbach in the district of Pfaffenhofen in Upper Bavaria in Bavaria, Germany and had a population of 160 in 2007.

External links 
 Rohrbach municipality

Villages in Bavaria